The Bridgeport-Spaulding Community School District is a school district headquartered in the Educational Services Center in Bridgeport, a community in Bridgeport Charter Township, Michigan.

It is a part of the Saginaw Intermediate School District and serves Bridgeport and portions of Buena Vista south of Hess Avenue.

In 2013 the Buena Vista School District closed. The Bridgeport-Spaulding Community School District took property of Buena Vista west of Airport and south of Hess as well as areas south of East Holland Road between Airport and Towerline. 135 ex-Buena Vista students were expected to go to Bridgeport-Spaulding. Ultimately 135 former Buena Vista students entered Bridgeport-Spaulding schools in fall 2013.

Schools
The schools are Thomas White Elementary School, Martin G. Atkins Elementary-Middle School, and Bridgeport High School. Atkins houses students in grades 2 through 8. Previously the district operated Bridgeport-Spaulding Middle School, which served grades 7 and 8. The school closed in 2009 and Atkins absorbed the school's students and teachers.

References

External links

 Bridgeport-Spaulding Community School District

School districts in Michigan
Saginaw Intermediate School District